Garret Ross (born May 26, 1992) is an American professional ice hockey player. He is currently coaching at Orchard Lake St. Mary’s. Ross was selected by the Chicago Blackhawks in the 5th round (139th overall) of the 2012 NHL Entry Draft.

Playing career

Junior
Ross was drafted in the 2nd round, 17th overall, by the Cedar Rapids RoughRiders in the 2009 USHL Entry Draft, however he instead played four seasons ( 2009 – 2013) of major junior hockey with the Saginaw Spirit of the Ontario Hockey League (OHL), registering 82 goals and 88 assists for 170 points, while earning 421 penalty minutes, in 217 games played. Ross was recognized for his outstanding performance when he was named to the 2012-13 Second All-Star Team.

Professional
On April 9, 2013, the Chicago Blackhawks of the National Hockey League signed Ross to a three-year entry-level contract. He was assigned to AHL primary affiliate, the Rockford IceHogs for the duration of his contract with the Blackhawks.

On July 1, 2016, Ross signed as a free agent to a one-year, two-way contract with the Arizona Coyotes. In the 2016–17 season, Ross endured an unsuccessful tenure with the Coyotes AHL affiliate, the Tucson Roadrunners, in collecting just 1 goal in 27 games.

As a free agent from the Coyotes, Ross signed a one-year AHL contract with the Rochester Americans on September 15, 2017.

After six seasons in the AHL, Ross as a free agent continued his professional career in agreeing to a one-year contract with the Fort Wayne Komets of the ECHL on August 29, 2018. Ross began the 2018–19 season, in playing 8 games with the Komets before he was traded to the South Carolina Stingrays in exchange for Jake Kamrass on November 4, 2018. Without appearing for the Stingrays, Ross was moved on in a trade to the Atlanta Gladiators on November 11, 2018. Two days later, Ross returned to the AHL in signing a contract with the Gladiators secondary affiliate, the Milwaukee Admirals. Ross appeared in 25 regular season games with the Admirals, helping him surpass 300 career AHL games, in posting 4 goals and 7 points.

As a free agent from the Admirals, Ross returned to the ECHL over the summer to agree to a one-year contract with the Jacksonville Icemen on September 5, 2019. Ross began the 2019–20 season with the Icemen, contributing 6 goals and 11 points in 19 games, before he was traded to the Kalamazoo Wings on December 19, 2019.

Personal
In March 2016, Ross was charged with a felony revenge porn charge for disseminating a photo of a woman engaged in a sexual act. Officials said Ross should have known that the image was to remain private, and that the woman had not consented to the dissemination. The IceHogs suspended Garret indefinitely pending the outcome of his legal proceedings. In March 2016, charges were dropped against Ross because the images had not been disseminated in Illinois. They were disseminated in Michigan, and the offense is a misdemeanour there.

Career statistics

Awards and honors

References

External links

1992 births
Living people
Atlanta Gladiators players
Chicago Blackhawks draft picks
Fort Wayne Komets players
Jacksonville Icemen players
Kalamazoo Wings (ECHL) players
Milwaukee Admirals players
Rochester Americans players
Rockford IceHogs (AHL) players
Saginaw Spirit players
Tucson Roadrunners players
American men's ice hockey left wingers
Competitors at the 2022 World Games
World Games gold medalists